Lilofee (minor planet designation: 1003 Lilofee), provisional designation , is a carbonaceous Themistian asteroid from the outer regions of the asteroid belt, approximately 33 kilometers in diameter. It was discovered on 13 September 1923, by astronomer Karl Reinmuth at the Heidelberg-Königstuhl State Observatory in southwest Germany. The asteroid was named after the Black Forest mermaid "Lilofee" from German folklore.

Orbit and classification 

Lilofee is a member of the Themis family, a very large family of carbonaceous, low-inclination asteroids, named after 24 Themis. It orbits the Sun in the outer main-belt at a distance of 2.6–3.6 AU once every 5 years and 7 months (2,032 days). Its orbit has an eccentricity of 0.16 and an inclination of 2° with respect to the ecliptic.

The body's observation arc begins with its official discovery observation at Heidelberg.

Physical characteristics 

Lilofee is an assumed carbonaceous C-type asteroid, which corresponds to the overall spectral type of the Themis family.

Lightcurves 

Since 2004, several rotational lightcurves of Lilofee were obtained from photometric observations by astronomers René Roy, Enric Forné and Robert Stephens. Lightcurve analysis gave a rotation period of 8.255 hours with a brightness variation of 0.57 magnitude.

In 2013, an international study modeled a lightcurve with a concurring period of 8.24991 hours and found a spin axis of (n.a., −99.0°) in ecliptic coordinates (λ, β).

Diameter and albedo 

According to the surveys carried out by the Japanese Akari satellite and the NEOWISE mission of NASA's Wide-field Infrared Survey Explorer, Lilofee measures between 27.29 and 36 kilometers in diameter and its surface has an albedo between 0.07 and 0.198.

The Collaborative Asteroid Lightcurve Link adopts an albedo of 0.08 and calculates a diameter of 34.04 kilometers based on an absolute magnitude of 10.7.

Naming 

This minor planet was named after the legendary mermaid/neck Lilofee, who lived in the small Mummelsee of the Black Forest in southwest Germany. Lilofee is also the title figure in the German folk-song The beautiful young Lilofee ("Die schöne junge Lilofee") by August Schnezler (1809–1853).

The asteroid was named by the discoverer. The name was proposed by ARI-astronomer Johannes Riem, after whom 1025 Riema was named. The official naming citation was also mentioned in The Names of the Minor Planets by Paul Herget in 1955.

Notes

References

External links 
 Asteroid Lightcurve Database (LCDB), query form (info )
 Dictionary of Minor Planet Names, Google books
 Asteroids and comets rotation curves, CdR – Observatoire de Genève, Raoul Behrend
 Discovery Circumstances: Numbered Minor Planets (1)-(5000) – Minor Planet Center
1003 Lilofee at Wolfram Alpha. Retrieved 12 August 2012.
3D orbit for minor planet 1003 Lilofee at The Centaur Research Project. Retrieved 12 August 2012.
 
 

001003
001003
Discoveries by Karl Wilhelm Reinmuth
Named minor planets
19230913